is a 1983 Japanese movie directed by Yoshimitsu Morita. The Family Game received several awards including the best movie of the year as selected by Japanese critics. Although the movie missed the Japan Academy Prize for the Best Picture (losing out to Palme d'Or Winner The Ballad of Narayama), Ichirōta Miyagawa was awarded Newcomer of the Year.

Plot summary
The Numata family consists of the father, Kōsuke (Juzo Itami); mother, Chikako (Saori Yuki); and two sons, Shinichi (Jun'ichi Tsujita) and Shigeyuki (Ichirōta Miyagawa). Shigeyuki is a junior high school student. He will soon be taking a high school entrance examination. Unlike his high school student brother, Shinichi, who lives up to the father's expectations, Shigeyuki’s grades are poor, and he is only interested in roller coasters. His father finds a private tutor, Yoshimoto (Yūsaku Matsuda), for Shigeyuki and imposes all responsibilities for his exam on the tutor. Yoshimoto's behaviour is extremely strange, including kissing Shigeyuki and hitting him painfully hard. Even though Yoshimoto is a seventh year student of a third-rate university, Shigeyuki’s marks become better and better. Eventually he passes the exam for the high school. At a family celebration, Yoshimoto begins to riot, hitting people, pouring wine on their heads, and throwing spaghetti around wildly.

Cast
 Yūsaku Matsuda as Katsu Yoshimoto
 Juzo Itami as Kōsuke Numata
 Saori Yuki as Chikako Numata
 Ichirōta Miyagawa as Shigeyuki Numata
 Junichi Tsujita as Shinichi Numata, the older brother
 Yoko Aki as Yoshimoto's girlfriend
 Jun Togawa as Neighbors wife

TV Series

The Family Game was adapted into a TV series in 2013 by Fuji TV, starring Sho Sakurai as the tutor Kōya Yoshimoto.

Themes
The film focuses on a dysfunctional middle-class nuclear family—each family member is connected not internally, but through the social roles they are expected to take on, and the pressure of these social expectations further accelerates the breakdown in their communication.

Japanese critics saw the film as showing the change to a new epoch and a post-modern sensibility. One said that if Japanese before and during the high growth economy defined their reality first though "ideals" and then through "dreams," and tried to change reality according to those visions, then in the post-high growth era, from the mid-1970s on, they no longer tried to change reality but to remain content with reality as "fiction." The Numatas' table is not unrealistic, but fixes the "un-naturalness"  of reality itself in an age when families watch television while eating. This epochal shift was marked, another critic said, by Morita's films and the works of novelist Haruki Murakami and musician Sakamoto Ryuichi, leading to a culture which celebrates meaninglessness.

Notes

Bibliography

External links
 
 Arun Kumar. The Family Game (1983) Review – An Incredible Dark Comedy on the Middle-Class Nuclear Family Life. High On Films. May 8, 2021.

1983 films
Films directed by Yoshimitsu Morita
Japanese comedy-drama films
1980s Japanese-language films
Best Film Kinema Junpo Award winners